Chandini Tamilarasan is an Indian actress who appears in Tamil and Telugu language films. She made her debut in the lead role in K. Bhagyaraj's Siddhu +2 (2010), before signing to play role in Naan Rajavaga Pogiren (2013).

Early and personal life 
Chandini was born to Tamilarasan and Padmanjali. She is half Tamil (from her father's side) and half Telugu (from her mother's side). She married choreographer Nandha on 12 December 2018.

Career 
She was among the contestants for the Miss Chennai 2007 pageant, aged 17, but did not finish in the top three. Post that in 2009, she appeared in a reality show on a Tamil channel and it was then that she got a call from K. Bhagyaraj's office asking her to come for a screen test for his new venture. She subsequently impressed and was signed to appear in Siddhu +2 which starred Bhagyaraj's son, Shanthnoo, alongside her. The film after a delay released in December 2010 but performed poorly at the box office, winning average reviews. In mid-2010, she signed on and worked in a film titled Padithurai featuring newcomers while the producer of the film was leading Tamil actor Arya. The film did not get a theatrical release. Although she received more offers, she declined all of them and returned to college to finish her education. She completed her degree in 2014.

She was seen in Prithvi Rajkumar's Naan Rajavaga Pogiren in 2013 alongside Nakul and Avani Modi, and the film has dialogues written by Vetrimaaran. Later that year she made her Telugu debut in the action-drama Kaalicharan, which is set in the 1980s, and based on true incidents revolving around the life of late MLA Erra Satyam. Her next two films, Lovers and Kiraak, released one week apart from another in August 2014. Upcoming films of Chandini include the Suseenthiran production Vil Ambu directed by Ramesh Subramaniam, which will see her playing a slum dweller and Anjana Ali Khan's Palaandu Vaazhga, in which she plays an IT professional. Besides, she is working on two untitled Telugu projects, a horror-comedy and a romantic-drama, which will be actor Naresh's son, Naveen's debut film. In 2020, she was cast in Rettai Roja replacing the female lead Shivani Narayanan.

Filmography

Film

Television
2020 - Thalampoo - Vijay TV - Female lead
2020 - 2023 - Rettai Roja - Zee Tamil - Female lead - dual role

References

External links
 

Indian film actresses
Actresses in Tamil cinema
Living people
Actresses from Chennai
Ethiraj College for Women alumni
21st-century Indian actresses
Actresses in Telugu cinema
Year of birth missing (living people)